Charlie Carl Carlson, Jr. (December 31, 1943 – August 30, 2015), was an American author, novelist, actor, and film producer. Known as "Florida's Man in Black", or "Master of the Weird", Carlson specialized in the paranormal, strange events and places, and many historical books. Carlson also produced and acted in radio shows and movie productions related the genre.

Military service and early career
Charlie Carlson joined the US Army and spent two tours in Vietnam with the 11th Armored Cavalry Regiment (Blackhorse) and after twenty-five years retired as a Command Sergeant Major. He earned several decorations including the United States Legion of Merit. After retirement, Carlson went on to become a showman of outdoor attractions, including owning a circus sideshow.

Writing and acting
He began his writing career as author of several Florida history books and the Civil War. In 1997 he began writing about Florida folklore and published the successful book, Strange Florida and, in 1999, portrayed Professor Charles Morehouse on the then-named Sci-Fi Channel's Curse of the Blair Witch. He has produced and appeared in several television documentaries related to Florida history and unexplained phenomena. He was a frequent guest on Florida talk radio and was the author of the 2005 best selling book, Weird Florida and, in 2006, published his first fiction novel, Ashley's Shadow.

He was a contributing writer to Weird Hauntings and Weird Encounters, both by Sterling Publishing.

Current activities
Mr. Carlson lived on the east coast of Florida, and was one of the founding members of the Grand Order of Weird Writers.

In 2008 he was producing an independent film entitled Henry Blackhart Is Dead, by Blue Heron International Pictures  about a legendary haunting set on the east coast of Florida during the Great Depression, and was acting in The Cleansing, about a real-life cleansing ceremony in a haunted building. He also produced and was featured among the cast for Hunt For the Devil, a ghost hunting DVD.

In 2010, he became the host of his own PBS television show, Weird Florida: Roads Less Traveled which aired nationally. In 2012 PBS released his new television show, Weird Florida: On the Road Again.

Bibliography
When Celery was King
I Got my Dress Tail Wet in Soda Water Creek
History of Bookertown (Co-writer)
First Florida Cavalry Regiment
History of Monroe (Co-writer)
Strange Florida I
Tux and Tales of a Wizard
Weird U.S.(Contributing writer)
Weird Hauntings (Contributing writer)
Weird Encounters (Contributing writer)
From Fort Mellon to Baghdad
Seminole County's Curious Files
Swedish History of Seminole County, FL. 
Weird Florida
Ashley's Shadow
Strange Florida II

Filmography

As actor
Curse of the Blair Witch 
Hunt For The Devil
The Cleansing
Stix and Stones
Zombies from Cyber Space

As narrator or host
Night With Johnny Duncan
Paranormal Florida
PBS Weird Florida: Roads Less Traveled
PBS Weird Florida: On The Road Again

As producer
Harry Blackheart Is Dead
Safe Haven

References

External links
Weird Florida: Roads Less Traveled

1943 births
2015 deaths
People from Sanford, Florida
20th-century American novelists
American horror writers
Novelists from Florida
American occult writers
American male film actors
United States Army personnel of the Vietnam War
21st-century American novelists
American male novelists
Recipients of the Legion of Merit
United States Army soldiers
20th-century American non-fiction writers
21st-century American non-fiction writers
American male non-fiction writers
Film producers from Florida
20th-century American male writers
21st-century American male writers